Custer is a village in Mason County in the U.S. state of Michigan.  The population was 285 at the 2010 census. The village is located within Custer Township.

History
Custer was platted in 1878 and incorporated as a village in 1895. The village was named for George Armstrong Custer.

Geography

Demographics

2010 census
As of the census of 2010, there were 285 people, 110 households, and 72 families residing in the village. The racial makeup of the village was 97.2% White, 0.7% African American, 0.4% Native American, and 1.8% from two or more races. Hispanic or Latino of any race were 3.9% of the population.

There were 110 households, of which 30.9% had children under the age of 18 living with them, 44.5% were married couples living together, 12.7% had a female householder with no husband present, 8.2% had a male householder with no wife present, and 34.5% were non-families. 26.4% of all households were made up of individuals, and 7.3% had someone living alone who was 65 years of age or older. The average household size was 2.58 and the average family size was 3.06.

The median age in the village was 39 years. 23.6% of residents were under the age of 18; 10.9% were between the ages of 18 and 24; 20.7% were from 25 to 44; 28.1% were from 45 to 64; and 16.5% were 65 years of age or older. The gender makeup of the village was 51.4% male and 48.6% female.

2000 census
As of the census of 2000, there were 318 people, 117 households, and 91 families residing in the village. The racial makeup of the village was 90.88% White, 2.20% Native American, 0.31% Asian, 3.46% from other races, and 3.14% from two or more races. Hispanic or Latino of any race were 3.46% of the population.

There were 117 households, out of which 35.9% had children under the age of 18 living with them, 56.4% were married couples living together, 17.9% had a female householder with no husband present, and 22.2% were non-families. 19.7% of all households were made up of individuals, and 9.4% had someone living alone who was 65 years of age or older.  The average household size was 2.66 and the average family size was 3.04.

In the village, the population was spread out, with 28.9% under the age of 18, 9.1% from 18 to 24, 21.4% from 25 to 44, 24.5% from 45 to 64, and 16.0% who were 65 years of age or older.  The median age was 37 years. For every 100 females, there were 100.0 males.  For every 100 females age 18 and over, there were 86.8 males.

The median income for a household in the village was $29,444, and the median income for a family was $35,625. Males had a median income of $29,375 versus $20,536 for females. The per capita income for the village was $15,436.  About 11.1% of families and 10.1% of the population were below the poverty line, including 15.5% of those under age 18 and 4.4% of those age 65 or over.

Climate
This climatic region is typified by large seasonal temperature differences, with warm to hot (and often humid) summers and cold (sometimes severely cold) winters.  According to the Köppen Climate Classification system, Custer has a humid continental climate, abbreviated "Dfb" on climate maps.

References

Villages in Mason County, Michigan
Villages in Michigan
Populated places established in 1878
1878 establishments in Michigan